Paolo Falchini (born 20 June 1964) is an Italian former swimmer who competed in the 1984 Summer Olympics.

References

1964 births
Living people
Italian male swimmers
Italian male backstroke swimmers
Olympic swimmers of Italy
Swimmers at the 1984 Summer Olympics
Mediterranean Games gold medalists for Italy
Mediterranean Games medalists in swimming
Swimmers at the 1983 Mediterranean Games
20th-century Italian people